RWH may refer to:
 Rainwater harvesting 
 Random walk hypothesis
 Red wine headache a bad headache that occurs in many people after drinking even a single glass of red wine
 Revolutionary Workers Headquarters, a U.S. Marxist-Leninist organization that formed out of a split from the Revolutionary Communist Party (RCP) in 1977
 Ridley–Watkins–Hilsum theory
 Real World Haskell, a book about the Haskell programming language